The Xunta de Galicia ("Regional Government of Galicia") is the collective decision-making body of the government of the autonomous community of Galicia, composed of the President, the Vice-President(s) and the specialized ministers (Conselleiros).

The Xunta has at its disposal a vast bureaucratic organization based at Santiago de Compostela, the Galician government capital. The Xunta de Galicia has delegations in the four capital cities of Galicia: A Coruña, Pontevedra, Ourense and Lugo.

Legal basis
Article 16, Section 2 of the Galician Statute of Autonomy states that

History
The Xunta de Galicia finds its origins in the Xunta of the Kingdom of Galicia active between 1528 and 1833. The Xunta was Galicia's representation to the central Spanish monarchy. The Xunta was composed by representatives from the cities (dioceses) of Santiago de Compostela, Lugo, Betanzos, A Coruña, Mondoñedo, Ourense and Tui. But at that time the Xunta did not hold real power; it was a consultative body only.

During the Peninsular War, started in 1808, the Xunta Suprema de Galicia directed the war against the French invaders and maintained the public order in Galician territory. This Xunta Suprema was in charge of military, legislative issues, and international relations. It was the first time that the Xunta had real autonomy, as the Spanish control weakened. This situation lasted until the French invaders were eventually expelled from the Iberian Peninsula and Ferdinand VII of Spain gradually recovered control over former territories (1813–1814).

In 1833 the Xunta was dismantled following the provincial division engaged in Spain by minister Javier de Burgos, under the regency of Maria Christina of the Two Sicilies. In this way, Galicia was separated into four provinces, each one managed by a Provincial Council.

Yet, in 1843 the Xunta Central de Galicia was created and presided over by Xosé Maria Suances. In 1846 commander Miguel Solís initiated a military uprising in Lugo. He put an end to the Provincial Councils and created the Xunta Superior do Goberno de Galicia, presided over by Pio Rodríguez Terrazo. This movement attempted to re-unify Galicia and called for Galicia's self-rule. Solís was eventually defeated at the Battle of Cacheiras (23 April 1846) and the so-called Martyrs of Carral were executed on 27 April.

Prospects for Galician self-government and possible restoration of a Xunta came close while the Galician Statute of Autonomy of 1936 was being discussed, at the time of the Spanish Second Republic (1931–1939). However, the Spanish Civil War (1936–1939) and subsequent Francoist Spain (1939–1977) halted the process. There was a temporary Galician government in exile, presided by Castelao, although this was not called Xunta but Consello da Galiza (Council of Galicia).

The process of devolution initiated by the passing of the Spanish Constitution in 1978 allowed for the establishment of a new Xunta, on 16 March 1978. The Galician Statute of Autonomy (1981), came to ratify the Xunta and Galicia's self-government.

Current cabinet

The consellerías are the different departments, or ministries, of the Xunta de Galicia. They are the responsibility of the conselleiros (masculine) or conselleiras (feminine). The conselleiros and conselleiras form the actual cabinet of the government, close to the President.

Location

 Edificios Administrativos San CaetanoSan Caetano, s/n15704 - Santiago de Compostela (A Coruña). 
 Pazo de RaxoiPraza do Obradoiro15705 - Santiago de Compostela (A Coruña).
 Sede Provincial da Xunta de Galicia na CoruñaVicente Ferrer, 215008 - A Coruña (A Coruña).
 Sede Provincial da Xunta de Galicia en PontevedraFernández Ladreda, 4336003 - Pontevedra (Pontevedra).
 Sede Provincial da Xunta de Galicia en OurenseHabana, 7932004 - Ourense (Ourense).
 Sede Provincial da Xunta de Galicia en LugoRonda da Muralla, 7027001 - Lugo (Lugo).
 Sede local da Xunta de Galicia en VigoConcepción Arenal, 836201 - Vigo (Pontevedra).
 Sede local da Xunta de Galicia en FerrolPraza de España, 215403 - Ferrol (A Coruña).

See also
 Reintegrationism
 Galician Statute of Autonomy of 1981
 Parliament of Galicia
 President of Galicia
 Anxo Quintana
 Emilio Pérez Touriño

References

External links 
Xunta de Galicia's official web (in Galician and Spanish)
The middle-age origins of the Xunta de Galicia (in Galician)